Gambel's quail (Callipepla gambelii) is a small ground-dwelling bird in the New World quail family. It inhabits the desert regions of Arizona, California, Colorado, New Mexico, Nevada, Utah, Texas, and Sonora; also New Mexico-border Chihuahua and the Colorado River region of Baja California. Gambel's quail is named in honor of William Gambel, a 19th-century naturalist and explorer of the Southwestern United States.

The species is not as widely introduced as the related California quail. It was, however, released on San Clemente Island in 1912 by Charles T. Howland et al., where it is currently still established.

Description
The Callipepla gambelii birds are easily recognized by their top knots and scaly plumage on their undersides. Gambel's quail have bluish-gray plumage on much of their bodies, and males have copper feathers on the top of their heads, black faces, and white stripes above their eyes. These birds have relatively short, rounded wings and long, featherless legs. Its diet consists primarily of plant matter and seeds.

Gambel's quail can be commonly confused with California quail due to similar plumage. They can usually be distinguished by range, but when this does not suffice, California quail have a more scaly appearance and the black patch on the lower breast of the male Gambel's quail is absent in the California quail. The two species are sister taxa which diverged during the Late Pliocene or Early Pleistocene, 1 to 2 mya.

Taxonomy

Subspecies
There are two recognized subspecies:
 C. g. fulvipectus (Nelson, 1899) – fulvous-breasted quail – southeast Arizona and southwest New Mexico to southern Sonora in Mexico
 C. g. gambelii (Gambel, 1843) – nominate – Utah and Nevada through Mojave Desert to Colorado, northeastern Baja California and Tiburón Island.

Behavior 
Gambel's quail primarily move about by walking and can move surprisingly fast through brush and undergrowth. They are a non-migratory species and are rarely seen in flight. Any flight is usually short and explosive, with many rapid wingbeats, followed by a slow glide to the ground.
In the late summer, fall, and winter, the adults and immature young congregate into coveys of many birds. In the spring, Gambel's quail pair off for mating and become very aggressive toward other pairs. The chicks are decidedly more insectivorous than adults, gradually consuming more plant matter as they mature. Gambel's quail are monogamous and rarely breed in colonies. The female typically lays 10–12 eggs in a simple scrape concealed in vegetation, often at the base of a rock or tree. Incubation lasts from 21–23 days, usually performed by the female and rarely by the male. The chicks are precocial, leaving the nest with their parents within hours of hatching.

Gallery

References

Sources

External links

Gambel's Quail videos at Tree of Life

Stamps (for Mexico, United States) with Range Map at bird-stamps.org

Callipepla
Quails
quail, Gambel's
Endemic birds of Southwestern North America
Native birds of the Southwestern United States
Birds of Mexico
Birds of the Rio Grande valleys
Birds of the Great Basin
Birds described in 1843
Fauna of the Mojave Desert
Fauna of the Colorado Desert
Fauna of the Yuma Desert
Fauna of the Lower Colorado River Valley
Fauna of the Sonoran Desert
Taxa named by William Gambel